Anne Evelyn Bunting (née Bolton) (born December 19, 1928), also known as Eve Bunting, is a Northern Ireland-born American writer of more than 250 books. Her work covers a broad array of subjects and includes fiction and non-fiction books. Her novels are primarily aimed at children and young adults, but she has also written the text for picture books. While many of her books are set in Northern Ireland, where she grew up, her topics and settings range from Thanksgiving to riots in Los Angeles. Bunting's first book, The Two Giants, was published in 1971. Due to the popularity of her books with children, she has been listed as one of the Educational Paperback Association's top 100 authors.

Life
Anne Evelyn Bunting was born in Maghera to Sloan Edmund Bolton, a postmaster, and Mary (née  Canning) Bolton, a homemaker. She married business executive Edward Davidson Bunting, whom she met in college, on March 26, 1950, and has three children: Christine, Sloan, and Glenn. She was educated in Belfast, Northern Ireland, attending Methodist College in the early 1940s and graduating in 1945; she then attended Queen's University, where she met her husband. After marrying, the couple moved to Scotland and started their family.

In 1958, Bunting immigrated to the United States with her husband and three children, later attending Pasadena City College in 1959. Bunting then enrolled in a community college writing course. She felt the desire to write about her heritage. Of her first published story, The Two Giants, she says, "I thought everybody in the world knew that story, and when I found they didn't - well, I thought they should."

Bunting lives in Pasadena, California with her husband.

Literary career
Bunting went to school in Northern Ireland and grew up with story-telling. In Ireland, "There used to be Shanachies...the shanachie was a storyteller who went from house to house telling his tales of ghosts and fairies, of old Irish heroes and battles still to be won. Maybe I'm a bit of a Shanchie myself, telling stories to anyone who will listen". This story-telling began as an inspiration for Bunting and has continued with her work.

Social diversity
With over 250 titles, Eve Bunting has engaged with many social spheres in her work. Every title focuses on a different issue. Smoky Night discusses racism and the Los Angeles riots with colorful illustrations. Fly Away Home illustrates a homeless father and son who live in an airport. Bunting has also addressed such topics as death, war, and troubled family life.

Awards
During her writing career, Bunting has won several awards for her books. She has received the Rishabh award for outstanding inspiration. She received the Golden Kite Award from the Society of Children's Book Writers and Illustrators in 1976 for One More Flight. Other honors include the Southern California council on Literature for Children and Young People Award, PEN Los Angeles Center Literacy Award for Special Achievement in Children's Literature, and Southern California council on Literature for Children and Young People Award Excellence is a Series Award. Coffin on a Case won an Edgar Award for Best Juvenile from the Mystery Writers of America in 1993.

Eve Bunting has also received the Heal the World award from a school.  A young reader wrote Bunting to notify her of the achievement. She said, "It is among of the most cherished honors I have ever received and the plaque hangs proudly above my desk."

David Díaz won the 1995 Caldecott Medal for illustrating Smoky Night, a picture book with text by Bunting.

In 2006, Bunting's book One Green Apple, illustrated by Ted Lewin, won the inaugural Arab American Book Award for books written for Children/ Young Adults. One Green Apple tells the story of a young girl who just immigrated to America from an Arab country and how she discovers that her differences are what makes her special.

Bunting is proud of her writing and how it affects children of all ages.

Selected works

Fiction

The Cart that Carried Martin (2013), illustrated by Don Tate 
One Green Apple (2006), illustrated by Ted Lewin
The Blue and the Gray (1996), illustrated by Ned Bittinger
Dandelions (1995)
A Day's Work (1994)
Coffin on a Case! (1992) —  Edgar Award for Best Juvenile Mystery
Fly Away Home (1991)
A father and son are homeless and they sleep at the airport. The son watches the planes fly away and hopes one day he will be able to leave.
Gleam and Glow
Viktor finds hope from two fishes during a harsh war in the 1990s.
The Ghost Children (1989)
How Many Days to America?
This book describes a family secretly leaving their country and taking a small boat to America.  When they reach America, they celebrate and have Thanksgiving. This is a very powerful Thanksgiving story.
Is Anybody There? (1988) — Edgar nominee
Scary, Scary Halloween (1986) — with illustrations by Jan Brett
Face at the Edge of the World (1985) — Adapted to an ABC Afterschool special titled "A Desperate Exit", starring Malcolm-Jamal Warner.
The Memory String
A young girl remembers her family, including her mother, by a string full of buttons. Each button belongs to a certain family member and memory. She is dealing with change as her stepmother and father paint the house. This story focuses on how the young girl copes with the pain of losing her father and gaining a stepmother.
Terrible Things: An Allegory of the Holocaust (1980), illustrated by Stephen Gammell
Woodland animals living in a clearing are taken away one group at a time by the Terrible Things from their forest home, the abductions going unquestioned. The other animals, out of fear, turn a blind eye as their neighbors are taken. A little white rabbit reflects that if perhaps the animals had stood together, the Terrible Things might have been stopped.
Moon Stick
Nasty, Stinky Sneakers — 1997 Sequoyah Children's Book Award 
Night Tree
A family travels through a forest and decorates a Christmas tree with oranges and popcorn. They sing and drink hot chocolate with the animals. The family leaves the tree for the animals to celebrate Christmas.
One More Flight (1976, Warne popedid) — Golden Kite Award from the Society of Children's Book Writers and Illustrators
The Presence: A Ghost Story (2003)
S.O.S Titanic
The Lambkins (2005)
That's What Leprechauns Do (2006)
The Sixth Grade Sleepover — 1989 Sequoyah Children's Book Award
Smoky Night (1994), illustrated by David Díaz
A young boy wakes up in the middle of the night and his family is forced to leave their house due to riots. Despite hatred in the city, two families are bonded by the events. Díaz won the annual Caldecott Medal for American children's illustration.
So Far from the Sea (1998) — Illustrated by Chris K. Soentpiet
A young Japanese American girl visits her grandfather's grave at Manzanar with her parents and younger brother.
Someone is Hiding on Alcatraz Island
Spying on Miss Muller (1995) — Edgar nominee
A Sudden Silence
Jesse Harmon searches for the hit-and-run serial killer who killed his brother Bry.
The Summer of Riley (2001)
 The Man with the Red Bag (2007)

Non-fiction

The Great White Shark (1982)
The Sea World Book of Sharks (1984)
The Sea World Book of Whales (1987)
Skateboards: How to Make Them, How to Ride Them (1977)

References

External links
 
Complete Listing of Works by Eve Bunting
Eve Bunting Biography
Eve Bunting Interview
Teaching Resources for Fly Away Home
Video Interview with Eve Bunting
Mystery Writers of America

1928 births
Living people
American children's writers
British children's writers
Edgar Award winners
Women novelists from Northern Ireland
Writers from Pasadena, California
People from Maghera
American Protestants
American women children's writers
People educated at Methodist College Belfast
21st-century writers from Northern Ireland
20th-century novelists from Northern Ireland
20th-century American women writers
21st-century American women writers
Northern Ireland emigrants to the United States